Prairie Dog Township, Kansas may refer to one of the following townships:

 Prairie Dog Township, Decatur County, Kansas
 Prairie Dog Township, Sheridan County, Kansas

See also
Prairie Dog Township (disambiguation)

Kansas township disambiguation pages